Schinia petulans, the impatient flower moth, is a moth of the family Noctuidae. The species was first described by Henry Edwards in 1884. It is found in the US states of Texas, Arkansas, Oklahoma and Florida.

There seem to be two generations per year.

The larvae feed on Chrysopsis subulata.

References

"Schinia petulans a noctuid moth". NatureServe Explorer. Retrieved March 23, 2020.
Nelson, John M. & Fisher, John F. (August 31, 2016). "Checklist of Oklahoma Moths".

Schinia
Moths of North America
Moths described in 1884